The 2021–22 Georgia State Panthers men's basketball team represented Georgia State University during the 2021–22 NCAA Division I men's basketball season. The Panthers, led by third-year head coach Rob Lanier, played their home games at the GSU Sports Arena in Atlanta, Georgia as members of the Sun Belt Conference. They finished the season 18–11, 9–5 in Sun Belt play to finish in third place. They defeated Arkansas State, Appalachian State, and Louisiana to win the Sun Belt tournament championship. As a result, they received the conference's automatic bid to the NCAA tournament as the No. 16 seed in the West region. They lost in the first round to overall No. 1 seed Gonzaga.

The season marked the Panthers' final season at the GSU Sports Arena, with the new GSU Convocation Center set to open for the 2022–23 season.

On March 27, 2022, head coach Rob Lanier left the school to take the head coaching position at SMU. On April 6, the school named Xavier assistant and former Georgia State player Jonas Hayes the team's new basketball coach.

Previous season 
In a season limited due to the ongoing COVID-19 pandemic, the Panthers finished the 2020–21 season 16–6, 8–4 in Sun Belt play to finish win the East division (divisions were created to cut down on travel due to the COVID-19 pandemic). As the No. 1 seed in the Sun Belt tournament, they defeated Arkansas State and Louisiana before losing to Appalachian State in the championship game.

Roster

Schedule and results

|-
!colspan=9 style=| Exhibition Matches

|-
!colspan=9 style=| Non-conference regular season

|-
!colspan=9 style=| Conference regular season

|-
!colspan=9 style=| Sun Belt tournament

|-
!colspan=9 style=|NCAA tournament

References

Georgia State Panthers men's basketball seasons
Georgia State
Georgia State